Christian Ziege (born 1 February 1972) is a German football manager and former player. He most recently coached FC Pinzgau.

A defender, he started his playing career at FC Bayern Munich, where he won two Bundesliga titles and a UEFA Cup before moving to A.C. Milan, winning an Italian Scudetto. In 1999, he joined Middlesbrough of the English Premier League, where he was voted the club's Player of the Year in his only season. A year later, he joined Liverpool and was part of the squad which won a treble of the Football League Cup, the FA Cup and the UEFA Cup in 2000–01. In 2001, he moved to Tottenham Hotspur, before ending his career back in Germany with Borussia Mönchengladbach.

With the German national team, Ziege won UEFA Euro 1996 and finished runner-up at the 2002 FIFA World Cup. He also represented the country at UEFA Euro 2000, UEFA Euro 2004 and the 1998 FIFA World Cup. An attacking left wing-back, Ziege was considered a dead-ball specialist.

Playing career

Club career
At club level, Ziege played for Bayern Munich (1990–97), Milan (1997–99) and Middlesbrough (1999–2000). In the summer of 2000, Liverpool F.C. made a £5.5m bid which exactly matched a get-out clause in Ziege's contract. Middlesbrough insisted they had received offers in excess of £8m for Ziege, but were forced contractually to allow Ziege to talk to Liverpool, who then signed him.

He made his debut for Liverpool in a 3–2 home win over Manchester City on 9 September 2000, replacing Steven Gerrard in the second half. A combination of knee injuries and the improving form of Jamie Carragher, meant he was transferred to Tottenham Hotspur at the end of that season. He scored two goals during his spell at Liverpool; against Leeds in the league and Stoke in the League Cup. Ziege also contributed to their treble in the 2000–01 season. He came on as an extra time substitute in the 2001 Football League Cup Final and scored a penalty in the shootout as Liverpool defeated Birmingham City, but he was not part of the match days squads for either the 2001 FA Cup Final or 2001 UEFA Cup Final.

On 14 March 2002, Liverpool were fined £20,000 by The Football Association for having made an illegal approach for Ziege when he had been at Middlesbrough. The player himself was fined £10,000. Whilst at Spurs he scored in the 2002 Football League Cup Final but he ended up on the losing side. However, by this time Ziege's injury problems were escalating, and by 2004 his contract was terminated by mutual consent so he could return to Germany.

Ziege returned to Germany with Borussia Mönchengladbach in June 2004, but announced his retirement in October 2005, having not played since the previous December due to a persistent ankle injury.

International career
Ziege was capped 72 times for Germany, scoring nine goals. Other than the Euro 96 win, he also played for his country at the 1998 and 2002 World Cups (during which he played the final game and sported a rather amusing mohawk), as well as Euro 2000 (he was a member of the Euro 2004 squad, but didn't play). Ziege was not initially named in Rudi Völler's UEFA Euro 2004 squad, but was then called up after an injury to Christian Rahn.

Managerial career

Borussia Mönchengladbach
Following retirement as a player, Ziege picked up his UEFA diploma for coaching. In 2006, he moved into coaching with his last professional club, Borussia Mönchengladbach, where he was named manager of the club's Under-17 team, succeeding Thomas Schumacher. In 2006–07 the club's U17 team had won ten out of seventeen matches with Ziege in charge when, in March 2007, he was handed the role of Director of Football at the club, as the replacement for the outgoing Peter Pander. At the time of his appointment, with ten matches to go until the end of the season, Borussia Mönchengladbach were at the bottom of the Bundesliga, with five points between them and safety. On 5 October 2008, Ziege dismissed Jos Luhukay and became interim manager. The interim job lasted until 18 October 2008 when Hans Meyer became the new permanent manager. On 15 December 2008 Ziege left Borussia Mönchengladbach.

Arminia Bielefeld and German junior national teams
On 26 May 2010, Ziege signed a contract as manager of Arminia Bielefeld. However, his managerial career got off to a poor start with Arminia Bielefeld only picking up three points from a single win from eight games, the worst start to an Arminia Bielefeld season in twenty-three years. Ziege was released from his post as manager of Arminia Bielefeld on 6 November 2010 after a 2–0 defeat against FC Augsburg.

From April 2011, Ziege worked for the DFB. He first coached the German U-19, before taking over the U-18 side in August of the same year. Ziege's contract was not renewed. His contract expires in the summer of 2014.

SpVgg Unterhaching
Ziege became the head coach of SpVgg Unterhaching on 20 March 2014. Ziege's debut was a 1–1 draw against RB Leipzig. He resigned on 25 March 2015. His final match was a 2–1 loss to Stuttgarter Kickers on 21 March 2015. On 30 November 2015, Ziege signed with Segunda División B side Atlético Baleares as head coach.

Ratchaburi Mitr Phol
On 27 December 2017, Ratchaburi Mitr Phol F.C. of Thai League 1 officially announced the appointment of Ziege as their new head coach. However, he left them after 2 games of the new season, in the week commencing 19 February "by mutual consent".

FC Pinzgau
On 29 April 2019, Ziege was named head coach for Austrian Austrian Regionalliga side FC Pinzgau. He departed the club in September 2022.

Career statistics

Club

International

Scores and results list Germany's goal tally first, score column indicates score after each Ziege goal.

Managerial record

Honours

Club
Bayern Munich
 Bundesliga: 1993–94, 1996–97
 UEFA Cup: 1995–96

A.C. Milan
 Serie A: 1998–99

Liverpool
 Football League Cup: 2000–01
 FA Cup: 2000–01
 UEFA Cup: 2000–01

International
 UEFA European Football Championship: 1996
 FIFA World Cup:  Runner-up - 2002

References

External links
 
 
 
 
 LFChistory.net player profile

1972 births
Living people
1998 FIFA World Cup players
2002 FIFA World Cup players
A.C. Milan players
FC Bayern Munich footballers
FC Bayern Munich II players
Borussia Mönchengladbach players
Bundesliga players
Association football wingers
Association football fullbacks
Expatriate footballers in Italy
Expatriate footballers in Spain
German expatriate footballers
Expatriate footballers in England
German expatriate sportspeople in England
German expatriate sportspeople in Italy
German expatriate sportspeople in Spain
German footballers
Germany international footballers
Germany under-21 international footballers
Liverpool F.C. players
Middlesbrough F.C. players
Premier League players
Serie A players
Tottenham Hotspur F.C. players
UEFA Euro 1996 players
UEFA Euro 2000 players
UEFA Euro 2004 players
UEFA European Championship-winning players
2. Bundesliga managers
Arminia Bielefeld managers
Borussia Mönchengladbach managers
SpVgg Unterhaching managers
CD Atlético Baleares managers
3. Liga managers
UEFA Cup winning players
Footballers from Berlin
German football managers
West German footballers